Kravaře is a town in Opava District the Moravian-Silesian Region of the Czech Republic. It has about 6,600 inhabitants. It is part of the historic Hlučín Region.

Administrative parts

Town parts of Dvořisko and Kouty are administrative parts of Kravaře.

Geography
It lies in the Opava Hilly Land within the Silesian Lowlands, on the left bank of the Opava River.

History
The first written mention of Kravaře is from 1224. Kouty was first mentioned in 1238 and Dvořisko in the second half of the 18th century. Between 1224 and 1263, the Kravaře estate was acquired by the lords from Benešov, who were further known as lords of Kravaře. From 13th to 15th century, it was one of the richest families in Moravia. In the second half of the 13th century, they had built a fortress in Kravaře. The last owner of Kravaře from this family was Petr Strážnický, who was forced to sell Kravaře in 1420.

The next important owner of Kravaře was Michael Sendivogius, who received the estate during the Thirty Years' War. After his death in 1636, his daughter married the free lord of Eichendorff. In 1721–1728, Jan Rudolf Eichendorff had rebuilt the fortress into a late Baroque castle. The Eichendorffs had to sell the estate in 1782 due to debts. After that, Kravaře were held by less important owners.

Since 1742 Kravaře and Kouty belonged to Prussia after Maria Theresa had been defeated. Dvořisko, located behind the Opava River, remained in Austrian Empire. In 1920, the area of Hlučín Region was returned to Czechoslovakia. During the World War II, it was annexed by Nazi Germany and administered as a part of Reichsgau Sudetenland.

For centuries Kravaře was only a village. In 1960, Kouty and Dvořisko were annexed to Kravaře and the new municipality gained the statute of a town.

Demographics

Sport

There is an ice-hockey venue Buly Aréna, which was opened in 2003. It has a capacity of 640 seats.

The town's football team is MFK Kravaře.

There is a golf course in the castle park.

Sights

One of the two main landmarks of the towns is Kravaře Castle. In 1990, the Baroque castle was acquired by the town. Today it serves as a cultural and social centre and houses a museum with permanent baroque and ethnographic exhibitions. The castle includes a  large castle park with several ponds and with several rare tree species.

The second landmark is the Church of Saint Bartholomew. The oldest part of the church is the white Renaissance tower from the early 16th century. The neo-Gothic church complex which includes the nave, the rectory and the former convent of the Sisters of the Heart of God (today the town hall), was built at the turn of the 19th and 20th centuries. The church was consecrated in 1896. Near the church there is a baroque sandstone statue of St. John of Nepomuk from 1730.

Notable people
Pavel Kravař (1391–1433), Hussite physician burned at the stake for heresy
Michael Sendivogius (1566–1636), Polish alchemist, philosopher and physician; lived and died here
Karl Albert Scherner (1825–1889), German philosopher and psychologist
Ivo Žídek (1926–2003), opera singer
Evžen Hadamczik (1939–1984), football player and manager
Alois Hadamczik (born 1952), ice hockey coach

Twin towns – sister cities

Kravaře is twinned with:
 Lisková, Slovakia
 Lubliniec, Poland
 Woźniki, Poland

Gallery

References

External links

Populated places in Opava District
Cities and towns in the Czech Republic
Hlučín Region